Estadio Municipal Nicolás Chahuán is a multi-use stadium in La Calera, Valparaíso Region, Chile.  It is currently used mostly for football matches, and is the home ground of Unión La Calera of the Chilean Primera División. The stadium was opened in 1950, but it was demolished and completely rebuilt in 2019, with a seating capacity of 9,200 spectators.

External links
 Stadium information

Nicolas Chahuan
Sports venues in Valparaíso Region
Sports venues completed in 1950
1950 establishments in Chile